The 500 metres speed skating event was part of the speed skating at the 1928 Winter Olympics programme. The competition was held on Monday, 13 February 1928. Thirty-three speed skaters from 14 nations competed.

Medalists

Records
These were the standing world and Olympic records (in seconds) prior to the 1928 Winter Olympics.

(*) The record was set in a high altitude venue (more than 1000 metres above sea level) and on naturally frozen ice.

Seven speed skaters were faster than the standing Olympic record with the two Olympic champions as new Olympic record holders. Bernt Evensen and Clas Thunberg each set a time of 43.4 seconds.

Results

References

External links
Official Olympic Report
 

Speed skating at the 1928 Winter Olympics